The Cry is a 1964 Czechoslovak drama film directed by Jaromil Jireš. It was entered into the 1964 Cannes Film Festival. It is often described as the first film of the Czechoslovak New Wave, a movement known for its dark humor, use of non-professional actors, and "art-cinema realism". The film's events are ambiguous, leaving it to the viewer to determine whether the telling is objective or from a character's point of view.

Cast
 Eva Límanová as Ivana
 Josef Abrhám as Slávek
 Eva Kopecká as Teacher
 Jiří Kvapil as Young doctor
 Slávka Procházková as Nurse
 Richard Záhorský as Doorman

References

External links
 

1964 films
1964 drama films
1960s Czech-language films
Czechoslovak black-and-white films
Films directed by Jaromil Jireš
Czechoslovak drama films
1960s Czech films